Zhusheng Temple

 Zhusheng Temple (Hunan), in Hengshan, Hunan, China
 Zhusheng Temple (Yunnan), Binchuan County, Yunnan, China

Buddhist temple disambiguation pages